Madame Courage is a 2015 Algerian-French drama film produced, written and directed by Merzak Allouache. It was screened out of competition at the 72nd edition of the Venice Film Festival.

Plot

Cast 

 Adlane Djemil	as Omar
Lamia Bezoiui	as Selma
Leila Tilmatine 	as Sabrina
 Faidhi Zohra	as Zhoubida

References

External links 

 :fr:Adlane Djemil

2015 drama films
2015 films
French drama films
Films set in Algeria
Films directed by Merzak Allouache
Algerian drama films
2010s French films